Linda C. Harriott-Gathright is an American politician serving as a member of the New Hampshire House of Representatives from the Hillsborough 36 district. She assumed office on December 5, 2018.

Early life and education 
Born in Philadelphia, Harriott-Gathright graduated from West Philadelphia High School. She earned an Associate of Science degree and Bachelor of Science from Daniel Webster College.

Career 
Harriott-Gathright worked for Verizon Communications from 1974 to 2008, where she specialized in contracts. She also served as a member of the Nashua Board of Alderman, Nashua Board of Health, and Nashua Housing Authority. She served as a member of the New Hampshire House of Representatives for the Hillsborough 36 district from 2012 to 2014 and was elected again in 2018.

References 

Living people
People from Philadelphia
People from Nashua, New Hampshire
Democratic Party members of the New Hampshire House of Representatives
Women state legislators in New Hampshire
Daniel Webster College alumni
Verizon Communications people
African-American state legislators in New Hampshire
Year of birth missing (living people)